The 1961 Cupa României Final was the 23rd final of Romania's most prestigious football cup competition. It was disputed between Arieșul Turda and Rapid București, and was won by Arieșul Turda after a game with 3 goals. It was the first cup for Arieșul Turda.

Arieșul Turda become the second club representing Divizia B which won the Romanian Cup final, after Metalul Reșița which accomplished this in 1954.

Match details

See also 
List of Cupa României finals

References

External links
Romaniansoccer.ro

1961
Cupa
Romania
November 1961 sports events in Europe